The 1917–18 PCHA season was the seventh season of the professional men's ice hockey Pacific Coast Hockey Association league. Season play ran from December 28, 1917, until March 8, 1918. The season was reduced to 18 games per team. The Seattle Metropolitans club would be regular-season PCHA champions, but lost the play-off to the Vancouver Millionaires. The Millionaires then played in the Stanley Cup finals series against Toronto, the NHL champions. Toronto won the best-of-five series 3-2 to win the Cup.

League business
The Spokane franchise folded and the league operated with three teams again. The players were distributed to the other teams.

The league decided to split the schedule with each half's winners playing for the championship. This was revised so that the first and second teams played off for the championship. Previously, playoffs were only held when teams tied for first place. Devised by Frank Patrick as a "second-chance" to increase interest in the league, the idea eventually spread to all North American professional sports.

Regular season

Final standings
Note: W = Wins, L = Losses, T = Ties, GF= Goals For, GA = Goals against
Teams that qualified for the playoffs are highlighted in bold

Source: Coleman(1966)

Playoffs
The Vancouver Millionaires defeated the defending Stanley Cup champion Seattle Metropolitans, taking a two-game total-goals series 3-2 on a 1-0 win over Seattle in the second game.

Seattle Metropolitans vs. Vancouver Millionaires

Vancouver Millionaires win two-games total-goals series 3-2.

Stanley Cup Final

Vancouver travelled to Toronto for the Stanley Cup final. The playing rules alternated between the NHL's six-man and the PCHA's seven-man rules. All games were won by the team whose rules were being played. Vancouver won the PCHA games 6–4 and 8–1 but lost the NHL rule games 5–3, 6–3, and 2–1.

Schedule and results

Source: Coleman 1966.

Player statistics

Goaltending averages

Source: Coleman(1966)

Scoring leaders

See also
 1917–18 NHL season

References

Notes

Bibliography

 
Pacific Coast Hockey Association seasons
2
PCHA